Song Möng Sihsu is a village in Mu Se Township, Mu Se District, northern Shan State.

Geography

Further reading
 Map - Districts of Shan (North) State

References

Populated places in Shan State
China–Myanmar border